Diane Wilkins is an independent award-winning filmmaker from Tallahassee, Florida, best known for high definition corporate and documentary production. Diane also produces gay and disability themed shorts in collaboration with the Mickee Faust Club, a theatre group focused on gay and disability activism. Shorts have screened in film festivals around the world.

Movies
All Hail Mickee Faust    
Deaf Relay: At Your Service  (2009)
A Gathering Storm (2009)
Mickee Faust's Gimp Parade (2008) Compilation
Disability Factor (2008)
Rats n' Roaches (2008)
I Know Why the Caged Rats Sing (2008)
Weimar House (2007)
Menopausal Gals Gone Wild (2007)
Dis(aster)abilities: Special Needs for Special Times (2007)
Boot Scootin' Beauty (2007)
Just the Funny Bits (2006)
Taking it Off (2006)
Cremmate Muffy (2006)
Excerpts: "A (Movable) Midsummer Night's Dream" (2006)
The Scary Lewis Yell-A-Thon (2004)
The Truth (2004)
Excerpts: "In the House of the Moles" (2004)
Annie Dearest: The Real Miracle Worker (2002)
K-Tel: Kurt Weill (2002)
Martha Steward's Crackhouse Essentials (2002)
Jake Ratchett (1999)
Tempted (1999)
On Becoming a Woman (1999)
Two Girls in Love (1998)
The Gay Caballero (1998)
Hair of the Moon (1994)

References

Living people
People from Tallahassee, Florida
1958 births
Film directors from Florida
American women film directors
American women film producers
Film producers from Florida
21st-century American women